The All-Star Final Vote was an annual Internet and text message ballot by Major League Baseball (MLB) fans to elect the final player for each team that participates in the Major League Baseball All-Star Game, after all other selections were made and announced. The first 33 players were selected by a combination of procedures. The sponsorship changed annually, but the contest remained similar from year to year. Each league presented a five-man ballot and gave the fans a few days to choose one final All-Star. This process was used from 2002 through 2018.

All-Star selection
The All-Star Game managers selected the entire lineups from 1933 to 1946. In 1947, the fans were given the ability to select the starting lineups. This continued until 1957, when Cincinnati Reds fans stuffed the ballot box and selected seven Reds and Stan Musial. This forced Baseball Commissioner Ford Frick to step in and replace Wally Post and Gus Bell with Willie Mays and Hank Aaron that season and to turn over the starting lineup selection to players, coaches and managers for several subsequent seasons. Since 1970, the fans have elected the starting lineup of one player for each baseball position (except the pitcher) for both the National League and American League teams.

In 2003, the major league players began electing a reserve for each position as well as five starters and three relievers, although the All-Star game managers performed this duty once. Now, the "Player ballot" includes coaches, managers and players across both leagues who participate in choosing eight reserves and eight pitchers for each All-Star team. Now, the managers only select the starting pitcher from among those pitchers already elected by the players. The managers also select the remainder of the roster spots except for the final spot while ensuring that each team has at least one representative. The All-Star game manager, guided by the baseball commissioner's office, then selects a list of five nominees for the fans to choose from for the remaining roster spot for each league's team.

On the Sunday evening nine days before the scheduled All-Star game, the rosters are announced and the All-Star Final Vote nominees are announced on a nationally broadcast show. The voting commences after the announcement of the nominees toward the end of the show, and continues for a prescribed number of days. Generally, a single daily update of the ballot standings is released during the voting. After voting concludes, the top vote-getter for each league is announced. Over the course of the seven years of the voting, over 100 million votes have been cast.

History

The first All-Star Final Vote was held during the 2002 season. The 2002 MLB All-Star Game had 30 player rosters so the fans were voting for the 30th player. The 2003 MLB All-Star Game rosters expanded to 32 following the 11-inning 2002 game. As a result, the fans elected the 32nd player. In 2009, the rosters again expanded to 33, including 13 pitchers,  following the 15-inning 2008 MLB All-Star Game. In 2003, the first corporate sponsor got involved in the ballot. Over the years, the sponsor has changed and the name of the fan voting procedure has changed both with the changing sponsors and the number of roster spots.

Through the 2018 MLB All-Star Game:
 The Chicago White Sox have had four winners, while the Boston Red Sox, Milwaukee Brewers, and Philadelphia Phillies have each had three winners.
 The Chicago White Sox have had eleven nominees, most in the American League. The Washington Nationals have had nine, most in the National League.
 Billy Wagner is the only three-time nominee. Shane Victorino and Mike Moustakas are the only two-time winners. No second baseman or designated hitter has been elected.
 Evan Longoria and Jean Segura are the only final vote batters who recorded an extra base hit or a run batted in. Johnny Damon was the first to record a hit or score a run. Chris Young became the first final vote pitcher to be involved in a decision, as the losing pitcher of the 2007 MLB All-Star Game.

In 2019, MLB discontinued the All-Star Final Vote.

Winners

All charts include seasons (including the current one at the time of the voting) in which the player has appeared in a Major League game for years of experience. Below are some additional abbreviations used throughout.  All-star game experience is based on the time of the final ballot nominations (before voting).

P – pitcher
SP – starting pitcher
RP – relief pitcher
C – catcher
1B – first baseman
2B – second baseman
SS – shortstop

3B – third baseman
RF – right fielder
CF – center fielder
LF – left fielder
OF – outfielder
DH – designated hitter

ANA – Anaheim Angels (until 2004) / LAA (2005–present) – Los Angeles Angels of Anaheim
ARZ – Arizona Diamondbacks
ATL – Atlanta Braves
BAL – Baltimore Orioles
BOS – Boston Red Sox
CHC – Chicago Cubs
CHW – Chicago White Sox
CIN – Cincinnati Reds
CLE – Cleveland Indians
COL – Colorado Rockies

DET – Detroit Tigers
FLA – Florida Marlins (until 2011) / MIA (2012–present) – Miami Marlins
HOU – Houston Astros
KC – Kansas City Royals
LAD – Los Angeles Dodgers
MIL – Milwaukee Brewers
MIN – Minnesota Twins
MTL - Montreal Expos (until 2004) / WSH (2005–present) – Washington Nationals
NYM – New York Mets
NYY – New York Yankees

OAK – Oakland Athletics
PHI – Philadelphia Phillies
PIT – Pittsburgh Pirates
SD – San Diego Padres
SF – San Francisco Giants
SEA – Seattle Mariners
STL – St. Louis Cardinals
TB – Tampa Bay Devil Rays/Rays
TEX – Texas Rangers
TOR – Toronto Blue Jays

Results

2002 candidates
In 2002, the All-Star game rosters had 30 positions on each team so the fan voting was for the thirtieth roster spot. As a result, the official name of the contest was "The All-Star 30th Man". The voting lasted only two days and was held exclusively online through each of the 30 teams' official websites and ESPN.com. The voting for the July 9, 2002 Major League Baseball All-Star Game Final Vote started on June 30 and concluded on with the announcement of the results on July 2, 2002. Both winners, Johnny Damon and Andruw Jones played center field and recorded 3 official All-Star game at bats.

2003 candidates

In 2003 the final vote had a named sponsor and the rosters expanded to 32 positions.  In 2003, ballot substitution was instituted. On Monday July 7, 2003, Kenny Lofton was added to the ballot to replace the Chicago Cubs' Corey Patterson who was injured on the day before. The voting for the July 15, 2003 Major League Baseball All-Star Game Final Vote was extended to three days beginning Sunday, July 6, 2003, at 8 PM Eastern Time and ending on Wednesday, July 9, 2003, at 6 pm Eastern Time. Although the leading vote totals (Geoff Jenkins – 2,872,200, Jason Varitek – 3,210,509 of a total 10.8 million) were released in 2003 individual results were not released for all contestants. In fact, the American League did not even release the final ordinal vote ranking with the final results so only the last update ordinal vote ranking is shown below.

Neither Varitek nor Jenkins played, but both Giambi and Castillo batted as well as played in the field 2003 game as substitutes. Giambi replaced Mike Sweeney. Castillo was a last-minute addition to the team.

2004 candidates

The voting for the 2004 Major League Baseball All-Star Game Final Vote again continued for three days, running from Sunday, July 4, 2004, and ending on Wednesday, July 7, 2004. The final results were announced with ordinal vote rankings (shown below) and approximate winning vote totals (Hideki Matsui – 1.2 million, Bobby Abreu – 2 million, of more than 9.5 million votes). Abreu appeared as a pinch hitter, while Matsui both pinch hit and played left field.

2005 candidates

In 2005, the contest was again called the "Ameriquest All-Star Final Vote". The voting for the July 12, 2005 Major League Baseball All-Star Game Final Vote again continued for three days, running from Sunday, July 3, 2005, and ending on Wednesday, July 6, 2005. This marked the first time pitchers were nominated and the entire National League ballot was composed of pitchers. The American League ballot was composed of four outfielders and a shortstop. 2005 marked the first year that cell phone text message voting was possible. Derek Jeter and Roy Oswalt took the voting lead after Day 1. By Day 2, Scott Podsednik overtook Jeter and went on to win. Again, ordinal vote rankings (shown below) and winning vote totals (Podsednik – 3,965,473, Oswalt – 2,652,549 of 15 million votes) were revealed.

Wagner was named to the 2005 team as a replacement for Pedro Martínez but did not play. Both Oswalt and Podsednik played, but Podsednik did not record an official at bat.

2006 candidates

In 2006, the contest was called the "Monster All-Star Final Vote". The voting for the July 11, 2006 Major League Baseball All-Star Game Final Vote again continued for three days, running from Sunday, July 2, 2006, and ending on Wednesday, July 5, 2006. Again, only the ordinal vote rankings (shown below) and the leading vote getter totals (Nomar Garciaparra – 4 million, A. J. Pierzynski – over 3.6 million of 18.6 million votes) were announced by Major League Baseball.

Liriano and Capuano were selected for the All-Star team as substitutes, but did not play. Liriano replaced José Contreras, and Capuano replaced Tom Glavine. Neither Garciaparra nor Pierzynski played.

2007 candidates

The 2007 "Monster All-Star Final Vote" included only pitchers (the National League included only starting pitchers). This is the 2nd time (2005) only pitchers were eligible for the final roster spot selection. The voting for the July 10, 2007 Major League Baseball All-Star Game Final Vote was the first four-day election, running from Sunday, July 1, 2007, and ending on Thursday, July 5, 2007. Voting leaders were announced daily. The ordinal vote rankings (shown below) and the leading vote getter totals (Young – over 4.5 million, Okajima – over 4.4 million of 23 million votes) were announced on the MLB.com results posting. Okajima (2–0, 0.88 ERA, & 4 saves in 38 relief appearances) and Young (8–3, 2.00 ERA, 99 K) are both first time all stars.

There was some controversy surrounding Roy Oswalt's nomination because he only had a 7–5 record at the time of nominations making him the only pitcher without eight wins nominated. However, he is considered by many to be the victim of lack of run support, questionable relief pitching and an average defense. This respect was shown by the players who had voted him to sixth place among National League starting pitchers making him the first alternate in case of injury to any of the five elected All-star starting pitchers. On the final day of All-Star Final Vote voting, it was announced that Oswalt (who was running third in the All-Star Final Vote) would replace John Smoltz who withdrew from All-Star game participation due to injury.

Brandon Webb of the Diamondbacks, the reigning NL Cy Young Award winner, replaced injured Colorado reliever Brian Fuentes. Neither Webb nor Oswalt played. Okajima did not play, but Young pitched 1 inning allowing a walk and a 2 run inside-the-park home run. As a result, he was the losing pitcher.

2008 candidates

The 2008 "Monster All-Star Final Vote" included no pitchers. The voting for the July 15, 2008 Major League Baseball All-Star Game Final Vote began Sunday, July 6, 2008, and ended on Thursday, July 10, 2008. The ordinal vote rankings (shown below) and the leading vote-getter totals (Longoria – 9 million, Hart – 8 million of 47.8 million votes) were announced on the MLB.com results posting. Longoria and Hart were both first-time all stars.

Longoria drew a record nine million votes for his selection, over second-place finisher Jermaine Dye. Jason Giambi finished in third after a highly publicized "Support the 'Stache" campaign. Brian Roberts finished in fourth, followed by José Guillén. Hart accumulated eight million votes, the second highest vote total in the competition's history. Hart joined teammates outfielder Ryan Braun and pitcher Ben Sheets. Finishing in a close second was New York Mets third baseman David Wright, who eventually made the team as a replacement for injured Chicago Cubs outfielder Alfonso Soriano.

Longoria was the first third baseman and second rookie to win the Final Vote. Hart's victory marked the third time that a club had a winning representative more than once; Geoff Jenkins (also from the Milwaukee Brewers) was elected in 2003. The other two clubs to have achieved this are the Red Sox (Damon, Varitek and Okajima) and the White Sox (Podsednik and Pierzynski).

2009 candidates

The 2009 "All-Star Game Sprint Final Vote" included no pitchers for the second consecutive year. The voting ran from Sunday, July 5 through Thursday, July 9. Eight of the selected players had never been an MLB All-Star. Washington Nationals shortstop Cristian Guzmán is a two-time All-Star, and Texas Rangers second baseman Ian Kinsler was an All-Star in 2008. In exchange for their sponsorship, text voting was available exclusively on Sprint capable mobile phones.

The Philadelphia Phillies and Detroit Tigers encouraged businesses in Michigan and Pennsylvania to allow their workers time off on Wednesday and Thursday to vote for both Inge and Victorino who were in second place in early voting.  Victorino became the fourth Hawaiian (following pitchers Ron Darling, Sid Fernandez and Charlie Hough) to be selected to the Major League All-star game.  This year's ballot, which is shown below in order of finish, was influenced by advertisements, online commercials, fliers, merchandise, official endorsements from people such as 2008 Republican presidential candidate John McCain, and contemporary technology such as Twitter.

2010 candidates
2010 Major League Baseball All-Star Game managers Joe Girardi of the American League and Charlie Manuel of the National League presented the 5-man ballots for the 2010 All-Star Game MLB.com Final Vote Sponsored by Sprint to determine the 34th player for each All-Star roster.  Votto was named on 13.7 million of the 26 million ballots, followed by Zimmerman, Gonzalez and Wagner, in order.  Swisher, who at the time was the most followed Twitter user, edged out Youkilis, in what was described as the closest race in the history of the All-Star Final Vote.  Heath Bell was named substitute for Yovani Gallardo before the conclusion of the Final Vote and was removed from the ballot.

2011 candidates
2011 Major League Baseball All-Star Game managers Ron Washington of the American League and Bruce Bochy of the National League presented the 5-man ballots for the 2011 All-Star Game Final Vote Sponsored by Sprint to determine the 34th player for each All-Star roster. Internet fans were able to vote at MLB.com and MLB team websites, while American and Canadian fans were also able to vote by text.  Fans were encouraged to participate as campaign managers by generating votes via Twitter, Facebook and MLB.com websites for their choice.  The fans elected Paul Konerko and Shane Victorino with 8.4 and 9.2 million votes of 50 million votes. Victorino was the first-two-time winner.  MLB.com voters received special offers for discounts or free service.

2012 candidates
2012 Major League Baseball All-Star Game offered the fans 5-man ballots to express their opinions in the 2012 All-Star Game Final Vote Sponsored by Firestone to determine the 34th player for each All-Star roster. Internet fans were able to vote at MLB.com and MLB team websites, while American and Canadian fans were also able to vote by text. In the final few hours, fans were allowed to vote via Twitter for the first time by using specific hashtags, but Chipper Jones' name was removed since he had been named to the All-Star game as a replacement for the injured Matt Kemp. The four hours of Twitter voting brought about 2500 votes per minute. Over 50 million votes were cast in the Final vote in total.

2013 candidates
2013 Major League Baseball All-Star Game offered the fans 5-man ballots to express their opinions in the 2013 All-Star Game Final Vote to determine the 34th player for each All-Star roster. Internet fans were able to vote at MLB.com, MLB team websites and via  text. In the final six hours, fans were allowed to vote via Twitter. The contest saw an unusual alliance in which Toronto Blue Jays and Atlanta Braves fans supported each other's nominees. This resulted in Toronto relief pitcher Steve Delabar and Atlanta first baseman Freddie Freeman winning the voting. Both Freeman and National League runner-up Yasiel Puig surpassed the 2009 15.6 million vote record, with Freeman totalling 19.7. The overall vote total of 79.2 million votes also surpassed the 2009 record (68.6 million).

2014 candidates

2015 candidates

2016 candidates

2017 candidates

2018 candidates

Nominees and winners by team
* – Includes replaced nominee
** – Was Anaheim Angels from 1997 to 2004.
*** – Was Florida Marlins from 1993 to 2011.
**** – Was Tampa Bay Devil Rays from 1998 to 2007.
***** – Was Montreal Expos from 1969 to 2004.

See also
Baseball awards#United States

References

Recurring events established in 2002
Recurring events disestablished in 2018
Major League Baseball lists
Final Vote